Arbab (also Romanized as Arbāb) is a village in Dorungar Rural District, Now Khandan District, Dargaz County, Razavi Khorasan Province, Iran. At the 2006 census, its population was 126, in 33 families.

It is a notable family name ( نجیب زاده ) in Middle East especially in country of IRAN (PERSIA). It indicates that those families have a notable background in the history of Iran and were mostly landlords, heads of their tribes or states back in the times of kingdom in Iran (PERSIA) for centuries.

See also 

 List of cities, towns and villages in Razavi Khorasan Province

References 

Populated places in Dargaz County